Index is a hamlet in the Town of Hartwick, New York, and partially in Town of Otsego, Otsego County, New York, United States. It is located at the corner of CR-11 and NY-28. Oaks Creek runs east through the hamlet and converges with the Susquehanna River just east of the hamlet.

References

Central New York
Hamlets in Otsego County, New York